Xenios Kyriacou  (born December 1, 1979) is a Cypriot footballer. He is currently under contract with the Cypriot side APEP Pitsilia.

External links

1979 births
Living people
Cypriot footballers
Association football midfielders
AEL Limassol players
Aris Limassol FC players
APEP FC players